Amphissa may refer to:

 Amphissa (city), an alternative writing for Amfissa, a town and a former municipality in Phocis, Greece
 Amphissa (gastropod), a small sea snails genus in the family Columbellidae
 Amphissa (mythology), an incest daughter of Aeolus's son, Macareus, with his sister, Canace, in Greek mythology
 Microvoluta amphissa, a sea snail species